Olive Island Conservation Park is a protected area in the Australian state of South Australia associated with Olive Island off the west coast of Eyre Peninsula and which is located about  west-northwest of the town of Streaky Bay.

The land under protection was declared as a fauna conservation reserve under the Crown Lands Act 1929 on 16 March 1967. The fauna conservation reserve was re-proclaimed as the Olive Island Conservation Park in 1972 under the National Parks and Wildlife Act 1972 on 27 April 1972 to ‘conserve a significant Australian sea lion breeding habitat.’ On 19 December 1991, additional land was added to the conservation park.

The conservation park is classified as an IUCN Category Ia protected area. In 1980, the conservation park was listed on the former Register of the National Estate.

See also
Protected areas of South Australia

References

External links
Olive Island Conservation Park webpage on the Protected Planet website

Conservation parks of South Australia
Protected areas established in 1967
1967 establishments in Australia
South Australian places listed on the defunct Register of the National Estate